The Musikexpress is a monthly German magazine that mainly writes about the rock and pop music. In addition to detailed interviews and articles about important rock, electro, hip-hop, pop, and independent musicians, the magazine offers reviews of sound carriers, concert reports, and articles on pop literature, pop art, films, and DVDs. Each release is also accompanied by a CD covering the topics of the respective issue. The magazine can also be released at irregular intervals with extras such as 7-inch vinyl singles, books, calendars, and DVDs. Musikexpress has been published by Axel Springer Mediahouse Berlin since the editorial team moved from Munich to Berlin in 2010.

References

1969 establishments in Germany
Axel Springer SE
Magazines established in 1969
Magazines published in Berlin
Monthly magazines published in Germany
Music magazines published in Germany
Periodicals with audio content